John Johnman (7 June 1900 – 1975) was a Scottish footballer who played mainly as a right back, although he was also used at wing half.

The majority of his career was spent with Motherwell, where he had a part in the team becoming established as one of the best in the country in the late 1920s, eventually took over from Dick Little in his preferred defensive position and featured in the 1931 Scottish Cup Final which the Steelmen lost to Celtic after a replay. He was still with the club when they won the Scottish Football League title in 1931–32, but made no appearances in that season for reasons unclear (Willie Dowall, previously considered a forward, was selected instead) and departed at its end.

Johnman then played in England for two years – one apiece with Stockport County and Halifax Town – before returning north with Dunfermline Athletic.

References

1900 births
1975 deaths
Date of death missing
Sportspeople from Wishaw
Scottish people of English descent
Association football defenders
Association football wing halves
Scottish footballers
Carluke Rovers F.C. players
Motherwell F.C. players
Dunfermline Athletic F.C. players
Halifax Town A.F.C. players
Stockport County F.C. players
Scottish Junior Football Association players
Scottish Football League players
English Football League players
Footballers from North Lanarkshire